Run It may refer to:

 "Run It" (DJ Snake song), a song from the 2021 film Shang-Chi and the Legend of the Ten Rings
 "Run It!", a song by Chris Brown